Ampuero is a municipality located in the autonomous community of Cantabria, Spain. It is surrounded by the municipalities of Limpias, Liendo, Voto, Guriezo and Rasines. Its strategic location in the centre of the Asón-Agüera County has made it the County head town, which contributes to important services and an industrial area in its surroundings. This town has various outdoor activities such as trout and salmon fishing, that provides an exquisite gastronomy. The Virgen Niña festivities, declared of regional touristic interest, have the popular encierros. Ampuero has a 32.3 squared km area, and it is located 55 km away from Santander. According to the 2007 census, the city has a population of 3.682 inhabitants.

Towns

References

External links

Municipalities in Cantabria